"What Is an Author?" is a lecture on literary theory given at the Société Française de Philosophie on 22 February 1969 by French philosopher, sociologist and historian Michel Foucault.

The work considers the relationship between author, text, and reader; concluding that:

The Author is a certain functional principle by which, in our culture, one limits, excludes and chooses: ... The author is therefore the ideological figure by which one marks the manner in which we fear the proliferation of meaning.

For many, Foucault's lecture responds to Roland Barthes' essay "The Death of the Author".

References

External links
  Michel Foucault et la fonction-auteur dans "Qu'est-ce qu'un auteur?"
 'What is an Author?'

1969 speeches
Essays in literary theory
Michel Foucault